The 1930 Colorado College Tigers football team was an American football team that represented Colorado College as a member of the Rocky Mountain Conference (RMC) during the 1930 college football season. In its fifth year under head coach William T. Van de Graaff, the team compiled an overall record of 2–4–2 with an identical mark in conference play, placing ninth in the RMC.

Schedule

References

Colorado College
Colorado College Tigers football seasons
Colorado College Tigers football